RoboCop is an American science-fiction, action, superhero, cyberpunk, media franchise featuring the futuristic adventures of Alex Murphy, a Detroit, Michigan police officer, who is fatally wounded in the line of duty and transformed into a powerful cyborg, brand-named RoboCop, at the behest of a powerful mega-corporation, Omni Consumer Products. Thus equipped, Murphy battles both violent crime in a severely decayed city and the blatantly corrupt machinations within OCP.

The franchise began in 1987 with the film RoboCop. RoboCop 2 followed in 1990, and RoboCop 3 in 1993. There have also been various television series, video game and comic book tie-ins. The franchise has made over US$100 million worldwide and a remake serving as a reboot titled RoboCop was released in February 2014. A new installment titled RoboCop Returns was in the works and will serve as a direct sequel to the 1987 film, ignoring other sequels and the remake, as well as the two live action TV spin-offs. As of June 2019, the script, which will be based on an original story from the writers of the 1987 film, Edward Neumeier and Michael Miner, was still being written. Neill Blomkamp was originally signed on to direct the film but left the project, and Abe Forsythe was later selected to direct.

Films

RoboCop (1987) 

RoboCop is a 1987 American cyberpunk action film directed by Paul Verhoeven. Set in a crime-ridden Detroit, Michigan in 2043, RoboCop centers on a police officer who is brutally murdered and subsequently re-created as a super-human cyborg known as "RoboCop". The film features Peter Weller, Dan O'Herlihy, Kurtwood Smith, Nancy Allen, Miguel Ferrer, and Ronny Cox.

In addition to being an action film, RoboCop includes larger themes regarding the media, resurrection, gentrification, corruption, privatization, capitalism, masculinity, and human nature. It received positive reviews and was cited as one of the best films of 1987, spawning a large franchise, including merchandise, two sequels, a television series, two animated TV series, and a television mini-series, video games and a number of comic book adaptations/crossovers. The film was produced for a relatively modest $13 million.

RoboCop 2 (1990) 

RoboCop 2 is a 1990 cyberpunk action film directed by Irvin Kershner  and starring Peter Weller, Nancy Allen, Dan O'Herlihy, Belinda Bauer, Tom Noonan and Gabriel Damon. It is the sequel to the 1987 film, and pits RoboCop against another cyborg created with the intention of replacing him.

The film received mixed reviews from critics. It was the last film directed by Irvin Kershner.

RoboCop 3 (1993) 

RoboCop 3 is a cyberpunk action film directed and co-written by Fred Dekker, released in 1993, set in the near future in a dystopian metropolitan Detroit, Michigan, and filmed in Atlanta, Georgia. Most of the buildings seen in the film were slated for demolition to make way for facilities for the 1996 Olympics. Nancy Allen as Anne Lewis, Robert DoQui as Sgt. Warren Reed, Felton Perry as Donald Johnson, Mario Machado as Newscaster Casey Wong and Angie Bolling as Ellen Murphy are the only cast members to appear in all three films. Robert John Burke replaces Peter Weller as RoboCop.

The film received very negative reviews from critics.

This is the first film in the RoboCop franchise to be rated PG-13.

RoboCop (2014) 

A remake of the original film and a reboot of the franchise was released in early 2014. The film is directed by Brazilian filmmaker José Padilha and stars Joel Kinnaman in the title role. Gary Oldman and Samuel L. Jackson co-star in supporting roles. According to Kinnaman, the film is a reimagination of the original story, and bits and pieces cater to fans of the original film. In July 2012, a viral website for the fictional OmniCorp was opened to promote the film.
Two months later in September, MGM and Columbia Pictures released the official film plot:

In "RoboCop", the year is 2028 and multinational conglomerate OmniCorp is at the center of robot technology. Their drones are winning wars around the globe and now they want to bring this technology to the home front. Alex Murphy (Kinnaman) is a loving husband, father and good cop doing his best to stem the tide of crime and corruption in Detroit. After he is critically injured in the line of duty, OmniCorp utilizes their remarkable science of robotics to save Alex's life. He returns to the streets of his beloved city with amazing new abilities, but with issues a regular man has never had to face before.

Future
In January 2018, original RoboCop writer Ed Neumeier said that he was writing a direct sequel to the 1987 classic film that would ignore both sequels and the 2014 remake: "We're not supposed to say too much. There's been a bunch of other RoboCop movies and there was recently a remake and I would say this would be kind of going back to the old RoboCop we all love and starting there and going forward. So it's a continuation really of the first movie. In my mind. So it's a little bit more of the old school thing." Later in July, a new film, titled RoboCop Returns, was in development, with Neill Blomkamp directing and Justin Rhodes rewriting an original script by Neumeier and Michael Miner. In 2019, Neumeier said that Blomkamp wanted RoboCop Returns to be as close to the first film as possible saying that Blomkamp feels that "it should be the proper Verhoeven if Verhoeven had directed a movie right after RoboCop." In June, Blomkamp confirmed that the original RoboCop suit would be used in this film saying "1 million% original"  when answering a fan's question on Twitter. The script was in further development according to Blomkamp. Blomkamp later announced in August that was no longer directing the film as he was focusing on directing a horror movie instead. In November 2019, Abe Forsythe was set to direct.

Television

RoboCop (1988) 

Based on the original film, the first RoboCop animated series features cyborg cop Alex Murphy (RoboCop), who fights to save the city of Old Detroit from assorted rogue elements, and on occasion, fighting to reclaim aspects of his humanity and maintain his usefulness in the eyes of the "Old Man", Chairman of OCP. Many episodes see RoboCop's reputation put to the test or soured by interventions from Dr. McNamara, the creator of ED-260, the upgradable version of the Enforcement Droid Series 209 and the top competitor for the financial backing of OCP. He continually develops other mechanical menaces that threaten RoboCop. In the police force, RoboCop is befriended as always by Officer Anne Lewis, but is also picked on and lambasted by the prejudiced Lieutenant Roger Hedgecock (who appeared as a minor character in the original film and his first name revealed in "Night of the Archer"), ever determined to be rid of him and his kind, whom he sees as ticking time bombs. Their rivalry comes to a fever pitch during the episode "The Man in the Iron Suit", in which Hedgecock comes close to finally beating Murphy with the aid of a new weapons system developed by McNamara. He almost kills Lewis when she interferes, enraging Murphy into tearing Hedgecock's iron suit apart and nearly crushing his skull before Lewis emerges, alive and well. Robocop is maintained by Robocop Project director Dr. Tyler. He was voiced by Robert Bockstael.

RoboCop (1994) 

RoboCop appears in RoboCop played by Richard Eden. The series takes place 4–5 years after the original film and ignores the events of the second and third films. Murphy's mother and father were introduced. His father, Russell Murphy, was a devout police officer himself for many years until his retirement. He is responsible for instilling Murphy with his trademark sense of duty and dedication to law enforcement, even after his transformation into a cyborg. Throughout the series, Murphy finds himself teamed up with his father on a few cases that often saw them utilizing the elder Murphy's expertise in dealing with reappearing criminals he'd chased back before his retirement. Although his father was stern, it was clear Murphy's parents loved and cherished him even after his 'demise'. However at the end of the episode "Corporate Raiders", Russell Murphy finds out that it's his son under the RoboCop enhancements. Ellen (known as Nancy in the series for apparent copyright reasons) and Jimmy Murphy were recurring characters as well, often finding themselves crossing paths with Murphy by falling in inadvertently or intentionally with the criminal element to which Murphy interfered and protected them from harm. Despite his series partner Madigan's concerns to tell his family who he is, Murphy replied firmly, "No", as he felt doing so would hurt them even more. He commented that "they need a husband... and a father. I cannot be that. But I can protect them".

RoboCop: Alpha Commando (1998–1999) 

RoboCop appears in RoboCop: Alpha Commando voiced by David Sobolov. The series is set in the year 2030 and deals with RoboCop being reactivated after five years offline to assist a federal high-tech group, "Alpha Division" in their vigilance and struggle against DARC (Directorate for Anarchy, Revenge, and Chaos), a highly advanced terrorist organization and other forces of evil whenever that may be, globally or nationally. The series shared many of the same writers who had contributed to the 1980s animated series, but had even less in common with the films or television canon that it was based on, including the first animated series. RoboCop now has numerous gadgets in his body that were never in the film, such as roller skates and a parachute. The show also suffers from major continuity errors. In the first episodes RoboCop's son appears in his memories flashback and he appears to be around 10. He appears in the series, to be exactly the same age and even wearing the same clothing, as his memories. The absence of Anne Lewis was never explained. Besides RoboCop himself, Sgt. Reed is the only character from the films in the series. Unlike the films, and previous TV incarnations, RoboCop never takes off his helmet in Alpha Commando.

RoboCop: Prime Directives (2001) 

RoboCop appears in RoboCop: Prime Directives played by Page Fletcher. The series takes place ten years after RoboCop. Alex Murphy as RoboCop has become outdated, tired, and quasi-suicidal. Delta City (formerly Detroit) is now considered the safest place on Earth, and he is no longer viewed as particularly necessary. The first half of the series focuses on Alex Murphy's former partner, John T. Cable, who is slain by RoboCop due to his system being hacked and being programmed to terminate Cable. Cable is then resurrected as a cyborg in most aspects identical to the RoboCop model, save for color and the addition of a second sidearm. "RoboCable" is sent to destroy RoboCop, but after several battles, Cable is convinced to join Murphy. Meanwhile, OCP (on the verge of bankruptcy) is taken over by a scheming executive, Damian Lowe, who manages to murder the entire board of directors. To bring OCP back, he plans to use an artificial intelligence called SAINT to automate the entire city. The second half of the series introduces Dr. David Kaydick, who plans to introduce a "bio-tech" virus (Legion) to wipe out not only Delta City but all life on the planet, infecting computers and people alike. He takes control of RoboCable by planting a chip in him that causes him pain or death, at Kaydick's discretion. RoboCop receives aid from a group of tech thieves led by Ann R. Key (Leslie Hope), who are determined to stop Kaydick, and RoboCop's own son, James – now fully grown and aware of his father's fate. RoboCop and his rag-tag band race to stop Kaydick from infiltrating OCP tower and activating SAINT, which would presumably kill almost all humans. During the confrontation, RoboCop and James reconcile with each other, and manage to rekindle RoboCable's previous personality. Ann. R. Key and Kaydick both die during a confrontation with each other. Utilizing James's EMP device, and having shut down RoboCop, RoboCable and LEGION are terminated. RoboCop gets rebooted without his previous OCP restriction programming (as well as restoring his identity as "Alex Murphy" as opposed to an OCP product number) or his prime directives. After viewing a goodbye message left by Cable, Murphy returns to active duty to stop the resultant crime in Delta City due to the EMP pulse blacking out the city.

Future
Ed Neumeier revealed to MovieHole that a RoboCop prequel TV series is in development that will focus on a young Dick Jones and the rise of Omni Consumer Products.

Storyline continuity

Cast and crew

Principal cast
 A dark gray cell indicates the character did not appear in that installment.
 An  indicates an appearance through previously recorded material.
 A  indicates an actor or actress was uncredited for their respective role.
 A  indicates an actor or actress portrayed a younger version of their character.

Additional crew

Production

Recurring elements

Omni Consumer Products 

Omni Consumer Products (OCP) is a fictional corporatocratic megacorporation in the RoboCop franchise. It creates products for virtually every consumer need, has entered into endeavors normally deemed non-profit, and even manufactured an entire city to be maintained exclusively by the corporation.
OCP is a modern example of the longstanding trope of the evil megacorporation in science fiction.

OCP is depicted as a megacorporation with products ranging from consumer products to military weaponry and private space travel. With the exception of the first film, it is also the true main antagonist of the RoboCop franchise. Their projects included RoboCop, the ED-209, and the RoboCop 2 cyborg. OCP owns and operates a privatized Detroit Police Department and in Robocop 3 employs criminals into a mercenary police outfit known as the Rehabs (short for Urban Rehabilitators).

OCP, throughout its depictions in the RoboCop films, has sought to fully privatize a dystopian Detroit, Michigan, into "Delta City", a manufactured municipality governed by a corporatocracy, with fully privatized services — such as police — and with residents exercising their representative citizenship through the purchase of shares of OCP stock. They also serve as part of the military–industrial complex; according to OCP executive Richard "Dick" Jones, "We practically are the military." Jones observes in RoboCop that OCP has "gambled in markets traditionally regarded as non-profit: hospitals, prisons, space exploration. I say good business is where you find it."

In RoboCop 3, OCP is bought out by a Japanese Zaibatsu, the Kanemitsu corporation. As a Kanemitsu subsidiary, OCP through its new CEO remains in charge of the destruction of old Detroit and the construction of Delta City by using the Rehabs as its police force, but are financially ruined whilst commander Paul McDaggett is killed by RoboCop. By the end of the film, OCP's brutal policies concerning Delta City are brought to light, many of OCP's majority shareholders sell their stock, and OCP itself is forced into bankruptcy.

In RoboCop, the OCP Chairman is played by David Gardner who still plans to undergo completion of Delta City under his MetroNet computer but is more a sympathetic character as he aides RoboCop against several enemies. He also oversees the new project NeuroBrain to monitor MetroNet by secretly-corrupted executive Chip Chayken and psychopathic genius Dr. Cray Z. Mallardo, who'd later menace OCP and RoboCop.

By the time of RoboCop: Prime Directives, OCP is being manipulated by Damien Lowe, a brash young executive who through murder and reallocation of resources, ascends to power to automate Delta City under a new artificial intelligence called S.A.I.N.T. This is manipulated by cyberterrorist David Kaydick, who seeks the destruction of the human race through a virus that can be introduced to computers and human beings alike.

For the 2014 remake, "OmniCorp" is a division of OCP, with the slogan "We've Got the Future Under Control." Led by CEO Raymond Sellars, OmniCorp is a leading manufacturer of military solutions worldwide, with their robots maintaining peace in hostile environments. However, due to the Dreyfus Act, which prohibits the use of robots for law enforcement, OmniCorp has been unable to penetrate the American market. Sellars plans to circumvent the bill by placing the body parts of critically injured Detroit Police officer Alex Murphy into a robotic suit.

ED-209

Reception

Box office performance

Critical and public response

Music

Other media 

In February 2011, there was a humorous ploy asking Detroit Mayor Dave Bing if there was to be a RoboCop statue in his 'New Detroit' proposal, which is planned to turn Detroit back into a prosperous city again. When the Mayor said there was no such plan, and word of this reached the internet, there were several fund-raising events to raise enough money for the statue which would be built at the Imagination Station. It is yet to be seen if a statue will actually be built, but it is reported that over $50,000 has already been raised on the Internet.

Video games 

Various licensed video games for various arcade, console and computer systems were released:

 RoboCop (1988)
 RoboCop 2 (1991)
 RoboCop 3 (1992)
 RoboCop Versus The Terminator (1993)
 RoboCop (2003)
RoboCop: Rogue City (2023)

Pinball
In 1989, Data East released a pinball machine based on the film.

Novelization 
A mass market paperback novelization by Ed Naha, titled RoboCop 2: A Novel, was published by Jove Books. Marvel Comics produced a three-issue adaptation of the film by Alan Grant. Like the novelization, the comic book series includes scenes omitted from the finished movie.

Comic books 

Various publishers have released RoboCop comic books:
 RoboCop (Marvel Comics, 1990–1992) – 23 issues, plus adaptations of the first two films.
 RoboCop versus The Terminator (Dark Horse Comics, 1992) which was also a video game and almost a film.
 RoboCop (Dark Horse Comics, 1992–1994), 13 issues; consisted of three mini-series (four issues each), plus adaptation of RoboCop 3
 RoboCop (Avatar Press, 2003–2006) – 11 issues; consisted of a nine-issue series and two one-shot comics.
 RoboCop (Dynamite Entertainment, 2009–2013) – 14 issues; consisted of a six-issue series and two four-issue series.
 RoboCop (Boom! Studios, 2013–) – 34 issues as of February 2016, including a reprint of Avatar's nine-issue series.

Theme park ride 
SimEx-iWerks (formerly iWerks Entertainment) opened RoboCop: The Ride around the world at its various iWerks Motion Simulator Theaters, amusement parks, and casinos in the winter of 1995.  The "Turbo Ride," as it was termed, was a Motion simulator "ride" attraction which could accommodate between 20 and 30 guests, and featured an oversized screen displaying the projection placed in front of synchronized hydraulically activated seats. The attraction was a mixture of motion picture film and computer animation, lasting approximately 4:00 minutes. The cost in the United States was $5.00 at pay-per-ride theaters. The attraction focused on the guest partnering with RoboCop, riding specialized police motorcycles on a mission to save the mayor of Detroit from "Cyberpunk ROM" and his gang. In the latter part of the attraction, the motorcycle would then convert into "hover mode" and simulate flying through the skyline of New Detroit. Though not as impressive or technical-savvy as other iWerks attractions at the time, the attraction was very popular amongst children and teenagers and especially in foreign markets outside of North America. The attraction was removed from the iWerks theaters in the North American market in 1998.

Advertisements 
In early 2019, fast food franchise Kentucky Fried Chicken announced that the latest celebrity to play the Colonel would be RoboCop. A series of commercials were produced with original actor Peter Weller reprising his role. 
In 2021, RoboCop appeared in one of a series of advertisements in the UK for the insurance company Direct Line, played by actor and stuntman Derek Mears.

Other appearances
 An action figure of RoboCop comes to life alongside Star Wars and Jurassic Park toys in The Indian in the Cupboard (1995).
 RoboCop appears in Steven Spielberg's film Ready Player One. He appears as an avatar within the OASIS game world. RoboCop is shown entering the OASIS and later seen during the Battle of Castle of Anorak where he fought the Sixers.
 Mortal Kombat 11, a fighting game released a downloadable content expansion pack titled "Aftermath" which added RoboCop, with Peter Weller reprising his role since the second film, as one of three new playable characters.
 RoboCop was added as a purchasable outfit in the online battle royale game Fortnite on May 16, 2022. Additionally, ED-209 appears as an emote.

Notes

References

Bibliography
 

 
Films about artificial intelligence
Brain transplantation in fiction
Cyborgs in fiction
American film series
Films set in the 2040s
Mecha films
Film franchises introduced in 1987
Mass media franchises introduced in 1987
Action film franchises
Metro-Goldwyn-Mayer franchises